Pie Five Pizza is an American fast casual restaurant chain specializing in personal pizza. The brand is owned by Rave Restaurant Group, which also owns Pizza Inn. , Pie Five operates 33 restaurants with locations in the following states: Arkansas, California, Illinois, Iowa, Kansas, Kentucky, Mississippi, Missouri, Oklahoma, Oregon, and Texas.

Concept
Pie Five was named for the concept of preparing a customized pizza in five minutes. The menu offers standard and made-to-order personal pizzas, salads, calzones, bread, and dessert. Many locations serve beer.

History

On June 3, 2011, the company Pizza Inn opened the first Pie Five Pizza in Fort Worth, Texas. They had five locations within the Fort Worth area by the end of the year, and as of January 2015, they had 31 locations.

Former PepsiCo and Yum! Brands executive Randy Gier joined the company in 2012. He served as CEO until 2016.

On January 9, 2015, the parent company Pizza Inn Holdings (ticker symbol: "PZZI") was rebranded as a portfolio company named Rave Restaurant Group (ticker symbol: "RAVE") as Pie Five Pizza locations began to increase.

In March 2017, Pie Five announced that all but one of the nine Chicago locations were closing, with only one more opening. Pie Five closed several midwestern stores in March 2017, including two locations in the Twin Cities metro in Eden Prairie and Woodbury and several Chicago area locations, to focus on its other markets. Later that year, they opened their first West Coast store in San Francisco, California.

Three locations opened in south central Pennsylvania in early 2017, before converting to a regional franchise and ultimately closing in early 2018.

In October 2019, RAVE Restaurant Group announced that its board of directors has named Brandon L. Solano as chief executive officer.

In end-of-quarter/fiscal-year reporting as of October 2020, Pive Five comparable store retail sales had decreased 15.7 percent from the previous year, with most of the 42 locations said to be using third-party delivery services.

A January 2021 analysis of the chain's struggles identified reasons such as a highly competitive market, very fast location growth and franchising, accustomizing pizza customers to the fast-casual individual experience, mixed reviews at individual locations that may have kept customers from returning, poor marketing investment, potential impending Nasdaq delisting, and a 2018 credit card security breach.

In March 2021, Pie Five had announced a new Panzano Pan Crust. The company says it is uniquely positioned against its competitors to make this product because of the types of ovens they use.

Awards
Pie Five Pizza is considered a pioneer of the first fast casual pizza category and has twice been named among Fast Casual's Top 15 "Movers & Shakers" (2013/2014).  Pie Five has also been recognized as a 2012 Hot Concepts winner by Nation's Restaurant News and one of "10 Hot New Restaurant Chains from Established Brands" by Forbes.com.

See also

 Blaze Pizza
 MOD Pizza
 Chipotle Mexican Grill

References

External links

Rave Restaurant Group
FastCasual: Pie Five Pizza expands into Florida
MarketWatch:Former Applebee's President and CEO to Open 10 Pie Five Pizza Locations in Kansas City Area

Pizza chains of the United States
Restaurants in Texas
Fast casual restaurants
Pizza franchises
Restaurants established in 2011
American companies established in 2011
2011 establishments in Texas